Olutanga, officially the Municipality of Olutanga (Chavacano: Municipalidad de Olutanga), is a 4th class municipality in the province of Zamboanga Sibugay, Philippines. According to the 2020 census, it has a population of 38,438 people.

The municipality is in the southwestern part of the eponymous Olutanga Island.

Geography

Barangays
Olutanga is subdivided into 19 barangays.

Climate

Demographics

Economy

Educational institutions

Tertiary
 Western Mindanao State University - External Studies Unit (WMSU)

High schools
 Loyola High School
 Olutanga National High School
 Pantaleon Cudiera National High School (Formerly Bateria NHS)

Elementary

Primary
 San Isidro Primary School

References

External links
 Olutanga Profile at PhilAtlas.com
 [ Philippine Standard Geographic Code]
Philippine Census Information

Municipalities of Zamboanga Sibugay